Bullioh is a closed station located in the town of Bullioh, on the Cudgewa railway line in Victoria, Australia. Today there is nothing left of the station.

The platform was shortened from 18.5m to 11m in 1976.

References

Disused railway stations in Victoria (Australia)
Shire of Towong